Ian McElhinney (born 19 August 1948) is an Irish actor and director. He has appeared in many television series in a career spanning more than forty years; notable appearances include Taggart, Hornblower, Cold Feet, and The Tudors. In recent times his best known roles are as Barristan Selmy in Game of Thrones, Morgan Monroe in The Fall, and Granda Joe in Derry Girls.

Early life
McElhinney was born in Belfast, the son of a Church of Ireland (Anglican) clergyman and teacher. He studied international affairs at Brandeis University in Waltham, Massachusetts. He worked as a teacher at Goole Grammar School, now known as Goole Academy, in Yorkshire, England, for several years before becoming an actor. He started acting professionally at the age of 30, playing Bill Sikes in a theatre production of Oliver!.

Personal life
He is married to playwright and actress Marie Jones; in 2009 the couple started their own company, Rathmore Productions Ltd. They live in Belfast and have three sons.

At the end of 2008, McElhinney formed another company, Stones Film Productions Ltd, with Mary Crossan Magowan, Chris Parr, and Anthony E Rowe. In 2013, Rowe departed the company. As of November 2022, the Internet Movie Database lists nothing made by Stones Film.

Filmography

Film and television

Radio

Web series

References

External links

1948 births
Living people
Male film actors from Northern Ireland
Male radio actors from Northern Ireland
Male television actors from Northern Ireland
Male actors from Belfast
20th-century male actors from Northern Ireland
21st-century male actors from Northern Ireland
Brandeis University alumni